Birdsong is an unincorporated community in Cullman County, Alabama, United States.

Notes

Unincorporated communities in Cullman County, Alabama
Unincorporated communities in Alabama